is BoA's 17th Japanese single. The title track was unexpectedly previewed at the Lipton event on October 15, and the song was reminiscent of some of her earlier songs such as Valenti (with the same writer and producer). This was the third single for BoA's then-upcoming album, Outgrow.

Overview
Released on November 23, 2005

Commercial endorsements
The "Dakishimeru" music video was featured in commercials for the Japanese music site, music.jp.

Music video
The music video for "Dakishimeru" was shot in an undisclosed location and features three scenes: BoA and her dancers dancing in a "club environment", BoA wearing a "Deluxe" shirt and standing on a stand (as the camera whirls around her) in front of a purple backdrop, and the last in which BoA is sitting in/standing by a car (a Lotus Elise). There are also short scenes in which BoA walks down a staircase in each of the three outfits she wears in the video.

Track listing
 Dakishimeru (抱きしめる)
 Before You Said Goodbye to Me
 Dakishimeru (抱きしめる) (TV Mix)
 Before You Said Goodbye to Me (TV Mix)

TV performances
 November 18, 2005 - NHK「POP JAM」
 November 21, 2005 - CX「HEY! HEY! HEY!」
 November 21, 2005 - YTV/NTV「ベストヒット歌謡祭2005」
 November 25, 2005 - ANB「MUSIC STATION」
 November 25, 2005 - NTV「Music Fighter」
 November 27, 2005 - Melodix
 December 1, 2005  - TBS「Utaban」
 December 2, 2005  - NTV「Music Fighter」
 December 23, 2005 -「Music Station 20th anniversary celebration special pro SUPER LIVE 2005」TV Asahi
 December 31, 2005 - 「56th NHK Khohaku」

Charts

References

2005 singles
BoA songs
Torch songs
2005 songs
Avex Trax singles
South Korean synth-pop songs